California's state elections were held November 3, 1998. Necessary primary elections were held on March 3. Up for election were all the seats of the California State Assembly, 20 seats of the California Senate, seven constitutional officers, all the seats of the California Board of Equalization, as well as votes on retention of two Supreme Court justices and various appeals court judges. Twelve ballot measures were also up for approval. Municipal offices were also included in the election.

Constitutional Offices

Governor

Final results from Secretary of State.

Lieutenant Governor

Final results from the Secretary of State of California

Secretary of State

Final results from the Secretary of State of California.

Controller

Final results from the Secretary of State of California.

Treasurer

Final results from the Secretary of State of California.

Attorney General

Final results from the Secretary of State of California.

Insurance Commissioner

Final results from the Secretary of State of California.

Board of Equalization
Final results from the California Secretary of State:

Overview

District 1

District 2

District 3

District 4

Judicial system

Supreme Court of California
Final results from the California Secretary of State:

California Courts of Appeal
See 1998 California Courts of Appeal elections.

California State Legislature elections

State Senate

There are 40 seats in the State Senate. For this election, candidates running in even-numbered districts ran for four-year terms.

State Assembly

All 80 biennially elected seats of the State Assembly were up for election this year. Each seat has a two-year term. The Democrats retained control of the State Assembly.

Statewide ballot propositions
Twelve ballot propositions qualified to be listed on the general election ballot in California. Eight measures passed while four failed.

Proposition 1A
Proposition 1A would provide for a bond of $9.2 billion for funding for at least four years for class size reduction, to relieve overcrowding and accommodate student enrollment growth and to repair older schools and for wiring and cabling for education technology; and to upgrade and build new classrooms in California Community Colleges, California State University, and University of California systems. Proposition 1A passed with 62.5% approval.

Proposition 1
Proposition 1 would amend Article XIII A of the Constitution, added by Proposition 13, to allow repair or replacement of environmentally-contaminated property or structures without increasing the tax valuation of original or replacement property. Proposition 1 passed with 71.1% of the vote.

Proposition 2
Proposition 2 would impose repayment conditions on loans of transportation revenues to the General Fund and local entities; and designate local transportation funds as trust funds and require a transportation purpose for their use. Proposition 2 passed with 75.4% approval.

Proposition 3
Proposition 3 would change existing open primary law to require closed, partisan primaries for purposes of selecting delegates to national presidential nominating conventions, limiting voting for such delegates to voters registered by political party. Proposition 3 failed with 46.1% approval.

Proposition 4
Proposition 4 would prohibit trapping fur-bearing or non-game mammals with specified traps, such as poison and steel-jawed leghold traps, and would prohibit commerce in fur of such animals. Proposition 4 passed with 57.5% approval.

Proposition 5
Proposition 5 would specify terms and conditions of mandatory compact between state and Indian tribes for gambling on tribal land. Proposition 5 passed with 62.4% approval.

Proposition 6
Proposition 6 would make possession, transfer, or receipt of horses for slaughter for human consumption a felony, and would make the sale of horse meat for human consumption a misdemeanor.  Proposition 6 passed with 59.4% approval.

Proposition 7
Proposition 7 would authorize $218 million in state tax credits annually, until January 2011, to encourage air-emissions reductions through the acquisition, conversion, and retrofitting of vehicles and equipment. Proposition 7 failed with 43.6% approval.

Proposition 8
Proposition 8 called for permanent class size reduction funding for districts establishing parent-teacher councils, testing for teacher credentialing, and pupil suspension for drug possession. Proposition 8 failed with 36.8% approval.

Proposition 9
Proposition 9 would prohibit assessment of taxes, bonds, and surcharges to pay costs of nuclear power plants. Proposition 9 failed with 26.5% approval.

Proposition 10

Proposition 10 would create state and county commissions to establish early childhood development and smoking prevention programs, and impose additional taxes on cigarettes and tobacco products. Proposition 10 passed with 50.5% approval.

Proposition 11
Proposition 11 would authorize local governments to voluntarily enter into sales tax revenue sharing agreements by a two-thirds vote of the local city council or board of supervisors of each participating jurisdiction. Proposition 11 passed with 53.4% approval.

See also
California State Legislature
California State Assembly
California State Senate
Districts in California
Political party strength in U.S. states
Political party strength in California
Elections in California

References

External links
"A directory of California state propositions"
Official election results from the California Secretary of State
California Legislative District Maps (1911-Present)
RAND California Election Returns: District Definitions

 
California